La Esperilla is a Sector in the city of Santo Domingo in the Distrito Nacional of the Dominican Republic. La Esperilla is in particular populated by individuals from the upper and upper middle classes.

Sources 
Distrito Nacional sectors

Populated places in Santo Domingo